The Hiding Place was the debut novel of Trezza Azzopardi, and was shortlisted for the Booker Prize in 2000.  It tells the story of the six daughters of a Maltese family growing up in Cardiff through the eyes of the youngest, Dolores Gauci. She describes her childhood life.

References 

2000 British novels
Novels by Trezza Azzopardi
Novels set in Cardiff
Anglo-Welsh novels
Picador (imprint) books
2000 debut novels